The Battle of Placentia was fought in 271 between a Roman army led by Emperor Aurelian and the Juthungi tribe, near modern Piacenza.

Background
Since the winter of 270, the Roman army had been occupied with repulsing a Vandal invasion at the Danube frontier. The expedition was ultimately successful, however, the Juthungi tribe seized the opportunity by invading Italia, counting on the absence of the Roman army. 

Emperor Aurelian, who was in Pannonia with an army to control the withdrawal of the Vandals, hastily moved into Italia but, as he approached Mediolanum, he received news that the enemy was already moving south-east, after sacking Placentia. According to the Anonymous Continuator of Cassius Dio, he immediately sent them a message demanding their surrender, which they rejected by saying that if he wanted to challenge them they would show him how a free people could fight.

The battle
The Juthungi surprised the exhausted Roman army in an ambush at a wooded area near Placentia, and the Roman army was defeated by the barbarians.

Aftermath
The news of this humiliating defeat produced two short-lived military revolts. The Juthungi continued to move on Via Emilia towards Rome. Since no remarkable military force was left between the invaders and the capital, panic spread through the city, which had grown far beyond its old walls. 

According to Historia Augusta, the Sibylline Books were consulted, and religious ceremonies were performed to call for the gods' help. The Romans escaped disaster when Emperor Aurelian soundly defeated the Juthungi at the Battle of Fano, leading to great celebration throughout the city.

References

Bibliography
 
 

Placentia 271
Crisis of the Third Century
Placentia 271
Placentia 271
3rd century in Italy
271
Placentia
Aurelian